P. angustifolia may refer to:

Populus angustifolia, a cottonwood tree
Prunus angustifolia, a plum tree
Pulmonaria angustifolia, a flowering plant
Pyracantha angustifolia, a flowering plant